Brayan Bello (born May 17, 1999) is a Dominican professional baseball pitcher for the Boston Red Sox of Major League Baseball (MLB).

Career
Bello signed with the Boston Red Sox as an international free agent in July 2017. He spent his first professional season in 2018 with the Dominican Summer League Red Sox and Gulf Coast League Red Sox. In 2019, he played in Class A for the Greenville Drive, compiling a 5–10 win–loss record in 25 games, all starts, with a 5.43 earned run average (ERA) while striking out 119 batters in  innings pitched. In 2020, due to the cancellation of the Minor League Baseball season because of COVID-19, he did not play professionally.

Bello started 2021 with Greenville before being promoted to the Double-A Portland Sea Dogs. He was selected to the mid-season All-Star Futures Game, and was named the Starting Pitcher of the Year within Boston's farm system at the end of the season. Bello made six starts for Greenville and 15 starts for Portland, going a combined 7–3 with 3.87 ERA while striking out 132 batters in  innings. On November 19, in advance of the Rule 5 draft, the Red Sox added Bello to their 40-man roster.

Bello began the 2022 season with Portland. He was ranked 97th in the list of baseball's top 100 prospects by Baseball America. On May 5, Bello threw a seven-inning no-hitter in the second game of a doubleheader against the Reading Fightin Phils; it was the fifth no-hitter in Sea Dog history. Bello was promoted to the Triple-A Worcester Red Sox on May 16. In his first nine games with Worcester, he posted a 6–2 record and a 2.81 ERA while striking out 72 batters in  innings. He made his major-league debut on July 6, starting against the Tampa Bay Rays at Fenway Park, taking the loss after allowing four runs on six hits in four innings. He made another start on July 11, then was optioned back to Worcester. Bello was selected to the 2022 All-Star Futures Game but replaced on the roster due to his major-league promotion. He was recalled by Boston on July 22. On August 4, he was placed on the injured list with a left groin strain. He rejoined the team on August 24. Overall with Boston during 2022, Bello pitched to a 2–8 record in 13 games (11 starts) while compiling a 4.71 ERA and striking out 55 batters in  innings. In 18 minor-league games (17 starts) he went 10–4 with a 2.34 ERA while striking out 129 batters in 96 innings. Bello was named the minor-league Starting Pitcher of the Year by the Red Sox organization.

See also
 List of Major League Baseball players from the Dominican Republic

Notes

References

External links

 Biography at soxprospects.com
 Interview video from La Nación Boston via YouTube (in Spanish)

1999 births
Living people
People from Samaná Province
Major League Baseball players from the Dominican Republic
Dominican Republic expatriate baseball players in the United States
Major League Baseball pitchers
Boston Red Sox players
Dominican Summer League Red Sox players
Gulf Coast Red Sox players
Greenville Drive players
Portland Sea Dogs players
Worcester Red Sox players